Albert Park Football Club (historically styled as Albert-park) was a 19th-century Australian rules football club based in the Melbourne suburb of Albert Park. The club was one of main first-rate senior football clubs during the unaffiliated era of Victorian football.

The club was established as the South Melbourne Football Club in May 1867. It changed its name to Emerald-hill in April 1868, then to Albert-park in May 1869. It played its home games at the Emerald-hill Ground.

The club quickly became one of the main senior clubs competing at the time. The best performance in its history was in the 1870 season; it was undefeated, but it finished second for the premiership behind , which was also undefeated.

The club also claimed the South Yarra Presentation Challenge Cup during the 1870 season, although the claim was disputed by the other clubs: rules required that a club was to win four cup matches without loss to claim permanent ownership of the Cup, but the other clubs disputed Albert-park's right to claim walkover victory against Railway when the latter club declined to play a scheduled game due to insufficient players turning up. In claiming the walkover, Albert-park players took to the field against no opposition and scored two goals, in a similar manner to the traditional ceremony of an unopposed horse "walking over" the track to claim a walkover victory – something one sportswriter described at the time as "simply absurd and unprecedented," but which later became common practice in the event of such a forfeiture.

In 1877, Albert-park was an inaugural senior member of the Victorian Football Association.

In 1880, Albert-park amalgamated with the neighbouring , which had joined the VFA as a senior club in 1879, to create a new club which carried on South Melbourne's name but retained Albert-park's red and white colours. The merged club went on to dominate metropolitan football during the 1880s, winning five premierships in ten years, and exists today as the professional Sydney Swans club in the Australian Football League.

A newer, unrelated club called the Albert Park Football Club competes today in the Victorian Amateur Football Association.

References

Former Victorian Football League clubs
Australian rules football clubs in Melbourne